Knorringia is a genus of plants in the family Polygonaceae. It is native to Central Asia and Siberia.

Description
The stem may be more-or-less upright or decumbent. The leaves are arranged alternately, usually lobed, carried on a short five-sided leaf stalk (petiole) with two distinct wings. The inflorescence is either a panicle made up of a few racemes or a single raceme. The flowers usually have five greenish-white tepals and eight stamens, included within the flower. They are either bisexual or have the gynoecium poorly developed. The fruits are in the form of achenes. The seeds have a thick outer layer (exotesta) and a very thin inner layer (endotesta).

Taxonomy
In 1966, Anna Czukavina created a section within the genus Polygonum, P. sect. Knorringia. The section was raised to the rank of genus in 1987 by Nikolai Tzvelev, and independently in 1989 by Suk-Pyo Hong. The genus is placed in the tribe Polygoneae in the subfamily Polygonoideae. A 2015 molecular phylogenetic study suggested that it was sister to all the remaining genera in the tribe, although only K. sibirica was included in the analysis.

Species
, Plants of the World Online accepted the following species:
Knorringia pamirica (Korsh.) Tzvelev
Knorringia sibirica (Laxm.) Tzvelev

References 

Polygonoideae
Polygonaceae genera